The 82nd Brigade was an infantry brigade formation of the British Army raised during World War I. It was originally formed from regular army infantry battalions serving away from home in the British Empire. It was assigned to the 27th Division and served on the Western Front and the Macedonian Front during the First World War.

John Longley commanded the brigade in 1915.

Formation
The infantry battalions did not all serve at once, but all were assigned to the brigade during the war.

 1st Battalion, Royal Irish Regiment
 2nd Battalion, Duke of Cornwall's Light Infantry
 2nd Battalion, Royal Irish Fusiliers
 1st Battalion, Leinster Regiment
 1/1st Battalion, Cambridgeshire Regiment
 82nd Machine Gun Company
 82nd Trench Mortar Battery
 82nd SAA Section Ammunition Column
 10th Battalion, Queen's Own Cameron Highlanders
 2nd Battalion, Gloucestershire Regiment
 10th Battalion, Hampshire Regiment

References

Infantry brigades of the British Army in World War I